This is a list of some of the Insurance Companies carrying on insurance business in Kenya. They are regulated by the Insurance Regulatory Authority:

 CIC Insurance Group Limited
 
  Allianz
  Madison Insurancehttps://www.madison.co.ke/
  British-American Insurance Company Kenya Limited
  Cannon Assurance Company Limited
  Mayfair Insurance Company Limited
  First Assurance Kenya Limited
  GA Insurance Company
  Kenya Reinsurance Corporation 
  Liberty Life Assurance Kenya Limited 
  Metropolitan Life Insurance Kenya
  Real Insurance Company
  Sanlam Kenya plc – was Pan Africa Life Assurance
  Heritage Insurance Company
  Jubilee Insurance Company Limited 
  UAP Holdings
  Resolution Insurance Ltd
  Jazapay Insurance Agency
  Pioneer Assurance Company Limited
Jimmy Chuka Uni insurance company

See also
 Insurance Regulatory Authority
 Nairobi Securities Exchange
 Economy of Kenya

External links
 Insurance Regulatory Authority
Motor Vehicles Act Kenya.Pdf
 Nairobi Securities Exchange
 College of Insurance

References

Insurance companies of Kenya
Kenya
Insurance